North Howell is an unincorporated community in Marion County, Oregon, United States. It is located on Howell Prairie. North Howell Elementary School, part of the Gervais School District, closed in 2002. Since the school closure, many area students attend Silverton schools as well as those in Gervais. Beginning in 2009, North Howell school has been leased to St. John Bosco High School, a private Catholic high school.

References

Unincorporated communities in Marion County, Oregon
Unincorporated communities in Oregon